Malcolm Endicott Peabody (June 12, 1888 – June 20, 1974) was bishop of the Episcopal Diocese of Central New York, serving from 1942 to 1960.

Biography
Peabody was born on June 12, 1888, in Danvers, Massachusetts, the son of Endicott and Fannie Peabody. His first paternal American ancestor was Francis Peabody, who came from England in 1635 and settled in New England. Peabody graduated from Harvard College in 1911. Between 1911 and 1913 he served as headmaster of the Baguio School for American Boys in the Philippines. Later he studied at Trinity College, Cambridge in England and then the Episcopal Theological School in Cambridge, Massachusetts from where he graduated with a Bachelor of Divinity in 1916. He was ordained deacon that same year and priest in 1917. During WWI he served as a Red Cross chaplain with the American Expeditionary Forces and as an Army chaplain with the 102d Field Artillery.

In 1921 he became rector of Grace Church in Lawrence, Massachusetts, while in 1925 he transferred to Chestnut Hill, Pennsylvania to become rector of St Paul's Church where he remained till 1938. In 1938 he was elected Coadjutor Bishop of Central New York and was consecrated on September 29 by Presiding Bishop Henry St. George Tucker. Upon the retirement of Bishop Coley on July 1, 1942, Peabody succeeded as diocesan bishop. He was formally installed as the 5th Bishop of Central New York on September 29, 1942, in St Paul's Church in Syracuse, New York. Peabody retired in 1960.

Family
Peabody married Mary Parkman and together had five children. He was the father of Endicott Peabody (1920 – 1997), governor of Massachusetts and Marietta Peabody Tree (1917 – 1991).

References

External links 
Malcolm Endicott Peabody from Peabody Family History

1881 births
1960 deaths
American people of English descent
People from Danvers, Massachusetts
Malcolm
Harvard College alumni
Alumni of Trinity College, Cambridge
Episcopal Divinity School alumni
20th-century American Episcopalians
Episcopal bishops of Central New York